The Constitutional Tribunal is the constitutional court of the Republic of Poland, a judicial body established to resolve disputes on the constitutionality of the activities of state institutions; its main task is to supervise the compliance of statutory law with the Constitution of the Republic of Poland.

Its creation was a request of the Solidarity movement following its 1981 National Congress that took place a few weeks before the introduction of martial law. The Tribunal was established on 26 March 1982 and judges took office on 1 January 1986.

The tribunal's powers increased in 1989 with the transition to the capitalist Third Polish Republic and in 1997 with the establishment of a new Constitution. The Constitution mandates that its 15 members are elected by the Sejm, the lower house, for 9 years. It is the subject of an appointment crisis since 2015.

It should not be confused with the Supreme Court of Poland.

Powers 
The Constitutional Tribunal adjudicates on the compliance with the Constitution of legislation and international agreements (also their ratification), on disputes over the powers of central constitutional bodies, and on compliance with the Constitution of the aims and activities of political parties. It also rules on constitutional complaints.

Composition 
The Constitutional Tribunal is made up of 15 judges chosen by the Sejm RP (the lower house of parliament) for single nine-year terms. The Constitutional Tribunal constitutes one of the formal guarantees of a state grounded on the rule of law.

Three judges, appointed by the President of the Tribunal, serve as members of the National Electoral Commission (Act of 5 January 2011 Electoral Code).

History

1982–1989: People's Republic of Poland
The Constitutional Tribunal was established by the amendment of the Constitution of the People's Republic of Poland on 26 March 1982. Due to the brevity of the introduced article 33a, it was decided that a law must be brought forth that would outline the proceedings of the Constitutional Tribunal. This became an intricate process with 15 drafts developed, and the final act was ratified by the Sejm on 29 April 1985 which allowed for the formal commencement of the Tribunal's judicial proceedings on 1 January 1986. But the courts competence and judicial capacity were limited at this time, as all rulings on the constitutionality of bills could be dismissed by a 2/3 majority vote in the Sejm. This in effect would place the rulings in an indefinite moratorium as these votes rarely occurred.

On 24 January 1986 the first motion, reference U 1/86, was brought before the Constitutional Tribunal on behalf of the Presidium of the Provincial National Council in Wrocław. The claimants sought to contend two paragraphs of the Ordinance of the Council of Ministers in regard to the sale of state property and the procedures and costs related to it as unconstitutional. In opposition to the government's stance, the court ruled in a 3-member panel on 28 May 1986 that the introduced paragraphs were unconstitutional. The Council of Ministers called for a reevaluation of the case, but on 5 November 1986 the Constitutional Tribunal upheld its ruling.

1989–2014: Third Polish Republic
In 1989 the Constitutional Tribunal's powers expanded as it secured the right to universally decide on the binding interpretation of laws. Many changes came with the enactment of the 1997 Constitution; the number of judges increased from 12 to 15, terms of office were elongated by 1 year for a total of 9 years, and the Tribunal lost its competence to decide the interpretation of legal statutes (in the form of abstract provisions).

2015–2016: Polish Constitutional Court crisis

In 2015, the governing Civic Platform (Platforma Obywatelska, PO) party lost both the presidential election and the parliament (Sejm) majority to the Law and Justice party (Prawo i Sprawiedliwość, PiS), which won an unprecedented absolute majority of seats.

Before the new president of Poland, Andrzej Duda, assumed office on 6 August 2015, and the new (eighth) Sejm was seated on 12 November 2015, the PO majority attempted to nominate enough judges so that the judicial branch would not quickly fall under the control of PiS.

In 2015, 5 of the 15 seats were due to be replaced. Three terms were due to end during the Sejm's recess (after the 25 October election but before the eighth Sejm was seated on 12 November). Two others were due for early December.

PO attempted to nominate all five seats due to be vacant in the year 2015 in advance. In June 2015, they enacted a provision in which it sought to transfer such power to the Sejm. Then on 8 October 2015, two weeks before the election, the Sejm elected these 5 judges. The new President Duda refused to let any of them take their oaths of office. After PiS won the elections and a majority of seats, they nominated a different set of five judges who were immediately sworn in.

This ignited a fierce partisan struggle, as the remaining judges in the Tribunal, most of which had been nominated by PO majorities, ruled out 3 of the 5 PiS nominees, validating instead 3 PO nominees, with the 3 PiS judges sworn in not allowed to hear cases.

As a result, a law was immediately passed by the PiS majority to force the inclusion of its nominees, sparking protests and foreign statements of either hostility or support. As this was not enough, a total of 6 "remedial bills" devised by PiS were enacted in the 2015-2016 period. A two-thirds majority was instated, diluting partisan influence. Finally, the term of resisting President Rzepliński ended and on 21 December 2016, President Andrzej Duda appointed junior member Julia Przyłębska as President of the Constitutional Tribunal.

Since the reform and takeover of the Constitutional Tribunal by the Law and Justice, the independence and sovereignty of the institution has been questioned. It was called a "puppet court" by Polish opposition judges' associations, some foreign judicial organisations and constitutionalist counterparts. In February 2020, former Constitutional Tribunal judges, including former presidents of the tribunal Andrzej Rzepliński,  and Andrzej Zoll, stated, 

PiS having been reelected in 2019 and in 2020, they were able to fill the Court's 15 seats completely by 2021.

Landmark decisions

Case K 1/20 

The Tribunal received a referral by 119 MPs on whether or not abortions of pregnancies unrelated to rape or not threatening the mother's life, which they call "eugenic", are constitutional. The signatories argued that the provision violates Constitutional protections of human dignity (Article 30), the right to life (Article 39) or the prohibition against discrimination (Article 32).

On 22 October 2020, an 11–2 ruling declared that abortion in Poland due to foetal abnormality was violating the Constitutional protection of human dignity. This effectively made abortions on that basis unobtainable for women in Poland. The provision had been used for 1074 of the 1110 legal abortions in 2019. The ruling triggered the October 2020 Polish protests, which forced the government to delay the ruling's publication in the Dziennik Ustaw until 27 January 2021.

Case K 3/21 

In July 2021, Prime minister Mateusz Morawiecki asked the Tribunal for a constitutional review of three provisions of Treaty on European Union. Following a series of hearings of prominent officeholders, the Tribunal ruled on 7 October 2021 in a 12–2 decision that:
 Article 1 of the Treaty on European Union (establishing an "ever closer union"), insofar as it is interpreted by the European Court of Justice in a "new step" (nowy etap) which
 enlarges the EU institutions' competence beyond the limits that Poland accepted via its treaties,
 opposes the primacy of the Constitution of Poland in both validity and application,
 opposes the sovereignty of the Polish state,
 is unconstitutional;
 Article 19 of the Treaty on European Union (that establishes the ECJ), insofar as it gives ordinary courts the right to disregard the Constitution, and to adjudicate on the basis of provisions repealed by the Sejm or deemed unconstitutional by the TK, is unconstitutional;
 Article 19 and Article 2 of the Treaty on European Union (values) are unconstitutional insofar as they empower ordinary courts to question the constitutionality of judicial appointments by the President.

Consequently, all branches of power in Poland argue that Poland's membership in the European Union does not entail that institutions external to the state have the supreme legal authority.

This was widely interpreted as a challenge of the primacy of European Union law, which emerged in Costa v. ENEL (1964),  with some talking of a judicial "Polexit". European primacy, however, had never been fully enshrined by previous Polish rulings, only insofar as it doesn't infringe on Poland's sovereignty (see K 18/04).

This landmark decision marks the culmination of the escalade over judicial nominations and reforms between Brussels and Warsaw that began in late 2015, when Law and Justice came to power, starting with the 2015 Polish Constitutional Court crisis. Many politicians in Brussels called upon the European Commission to freeze payments to Poland. The Commission President said she was deeply concerned, and ordered to act swiftly. The recently-implemented Rule of Law Conditionality Regulation could be used.

Presidents and vice presidents

Justices

Current

2015 Polish Constitutional Court crisis 
In the summer and autumn 2015, a change of power occurred with Civic Platform (PO) losing both the Sejm and the Presidency to Law and Justice (PiS). These two branches appoint and swear new judges, respectively.

In 2015, the term of five judges was set to expire, three of which between Sejm election day and the new legislature's session, and two the month after. PO tried to appoint them in advance (they were: Roman Hauser, Krzysztof Ślebzak, Andrzej Jakubecki, Bronisław Sitek and Andrzej Sokala) but their oath was denied by the new PiS President, Andrzej Duda. As a result, they never sat. The new PiS majority nominated three other judges on 2 December 2015 (Henryk Cioch, Lech Morawski, Mariusz Muszyński) and two others the next week (Piotr Pszczółkowski, Julia Przyłębska), who were immediately sworn in. Cioch and Morawski later died while in office, and were replaced by Justyn Piskorski and Jarosław Wyrembak.

Of the appointments made before the election, the Constitutional Tribunal itself invalidated the last two and accepted the first three. As a consequence, of the appointments made after the election, the Tribunal accepted the last two (Piotr Pszczółkowski and Julia Przyłębska) and invalidated the first three (Henryk Cioch, Lech Morawski and Mariusz Muszyński). However, the ruling was disputed by the new government, who then went on to change the statutes regulating the Court, in order to have its nominees sit. See 2015 Polish Constitutional Court crisis.

Multiple cases were sent to the European Court of Human Rights and the European Court of Justice, challenging the Tribunal's legal status. In Xero Flor v Poland, the ECHR ruled on 7 May 2021 that a Polish company did not have the right to a fair trial because Muszyński's election was unlawful. The Constitutional Tribunal is expected to judge on 3 August 2021 whether it will comply to the ruling or not; this is interpreted as a decision on whether the European or Polish courts are sovereign. In a 14 July 2021 ruling, the Tribunal rejected the constitutionality of any attempt by the ECHR to suspend the Polish tribunals, as such competence has never been transferred by any treaty.

Length of tenure 
This graphical timeline depicts the length of each current justice's tenure on the Court:

Former

See also 
Judiciary
Rule of law
Rule According to Higher Law
Supreme Court of Poland
2015–present Polish constitutional crisis

Notes

References

External links 
 
 

Politics of Poland
Poland
Judiciary of Poland
1982 establishments in Poland
Courts and tribunals established in 1982